Compagnie de gestion de Matane Inc. (COGEMA) is a subsidiary of Canadian National Railway (CN) operating a dedicated railcar ferry service in Quebec between Matane and Baie-Comeau; additionally it provides occasional railcar ferry service to isolated rail networks at the ports of Port Cartier, Sept-Îles and Havre-Saint-Pierre. It also operates industrial switching to rail customers in Baie-Comeau.

COGEMA began operations in 1975 and operates the company's only railcar ferry, the MV Georges Alexandre Lebel. COGEMA was sold by CN to Quebec Railway Corporation on 14 February 1999 when QRC also purchased the Matane and Mont Joli Subdivisions. In November 2008, CN re-purchased these assets from QRC.

See also 
 Roll-on/roll-off
 Société des traversiers du Québecprovides road vehicle service on the same route.

Sources 
 Trains magazine (February 2009, p9)

Ferry companies of Quebec
Quebec railways
Industrial railways in Canada
Matane
Canadian National Railway subsidiaries
Transport in Sept-Îles, Quebec